This page lists the members inducted in the ITTF Hall of Fame – founded in 1993 – in the order as they appear in the official hall of fame maintained by the International Table Tennis Federation. The ITTF Hall of Fame includes both table tennis players and officers.

To qualify for the ITTF Hall of Fame, an athlete must have won a minimum of five gold medals in Table Tennis World Championships, Olympic Games, and Paralympic Games. For more detailed information, see the page of each player.

Inducted in 1993
   Viktor Barna
   Richard Bergmann
   Laszlo Bellak
  István Kelen
  James McClure: inducted as officer.
  Zoltán Mechlovits
  Miklós Szabados
  Bohumil Váňa
  Mária Mednyánszky
  Marie Kettnerová
  Anna Sipos
  Věra Votrubcová

Inducted in 1995
  Ivan Andreadis
  Ivor Montagu: inducted as officer.
  Ferenc Sidó
  Ladislav Štípek
  František Tokár
  Angelica Rozeanu
  Gizella Farkas
  Ella Zeller

Inducted in 1997
  Ichiro Ogimura
  Johnny Leach
  Toshiaki Tanaka
  Roy Evans: inducted as officer.
  A.K. Vint: inducted as officer.
  Fujie Eguchi
  Kimiyo Matsuzaki

Inducted in 1999
  Zhuang Zedong
  Lin Huiqing
  Li Furong

Inducted in 2001
  Guo Yuehua
  Jiang Jialiang
  Zhang Xielin
  Liang Geliang
  Cao Yanhua
  Nobuhiko Hasegawa

Inducted in 2003
  Jan-Ove Waldner
  Jörgen Persson
  Peter Karlsson
  Wang Tao
  Deng Yaping
  Wang Nan
  Ge Xinai
  Liu Wei

Inducted in 2005
  Liu Guoliang
  Wang Liqin
  Li Ju
  Qiao Hong
  Zhang Yining

Inducted in 2010
  Xu Yinsheng: inducted as officer.
  Cai Zhenhua
  Kazuko Ito
  Trude Pritzi
  Hyun Jung-Hwa
  Zhang Deying
  Kong Linghui
  Ma Lin
  Chen Qi
  Wang Hao
  Guo Yue

Inducted in 2013
  Li Xiaoxia
  Ma Long
  Zhang Jike

Inducted in 2016
  Ding Ning
  Liu Shiwen
  Xu Xin

See also
 List of table tennis players

References

External links
 The ITTF Hall of Fame

International Table Tennis Federation
Sports halls of fame
Sports hall of fame inductees
Awards established in 1993